The 2015 Chelmsford City Council election took place on 7 May 2015 to elect members of Chelmsford City Council in England. This was on the same day as other local elections.

Results summary

Ward Results

Bicknacre and East and West Hanningfield

Boreham and The Leighs

Broomfield and The Walthams

Chelmer Village and Beaulieu Park

Chelmsford Rural West

Galleywood

Goat Hall

Great Baddow East

Great Baddow West

Little Baddow, Danbury and Sandon

Marconi

Moulsham and Central

Moulsham Lodge

Patching Hall

Rettendon and Runwell

South Hanningfield, Stock and Margaretting

South Woodham - Chetwood and Collingwood

South Woodham - Elmwood and Woodville

Springfield North

St. Andrew's

The Lawns

Trinity

Waterhouse Farm

Writtle

By-elections

Moulsham & Central

Caused by the resignation of Cllr Victoria Camp.

References

2015 English local elections
May 2015 events in the United Kingdom
2015
2010s in Essex